The Sanchi inscription of Chandragupta II is an epigraphic record documenting a donation to the Buddhist establishment at Sanchi in the reign of king Chandragupta II (circa CE 375–415). It is dated year 93 in the Gupta era.

Location
Sanchi is located in Raisen District, Madhya Pradesh, India. The inscription is in situ on railing of the main stūpa, to the immediate left of the eastern gate.

Publication
After early notices in the time of James Prinsep, the inscription was published by John Faithfull Fleet in 1888. For later editions and translations, see The South Asia Inscriptions Database.

Historical Significance
The inscription is important for the history of Sanchi because it was added to the outer railing, a part of the monument generally dated to circa 100 BCE. It therefore registers a donation to a religious site that was at least five centuries old when the gift was made. The historical significance of the inscription as a document of inter-religious tolerance has been explored by Hans T. Bakker.

Text
The text is in Sanskrit and available through The South Asia Inscriptions Database, see external links.

Translation

See also
Indian inscriptions

Notes

External links
The Sanchi inscription in SIDDHAṂ: The South Asia Inscription Database
ERC research archive : Religion, Region, Language and the State
ERC research archive : SIDDHAṂ: The South Asia Inscriptions Database

Sanskrit inscriptions in India
Gupta and post-Gupta inscriptions